American Music: Off the Record is a 2008 American documentary film that features theorists Noam Chomsky and Douglas Rushkoff in an interrogation of the American music industry. The film covers a great deal of ground from the authenticity of live music to the circumvention of the corporate machine by indie distribution, to the demise of the privately owned music store.

Cast

 Bernard Allison
 Paul Barrere
 Bastard Sons of Johnny Cash
 The Belairs
 Bottle Rockets
 Savoy Brown
 Jackson Browne
 Buckethead
 Canned Heat
 Carlene Carter
 The Cates Brothers
 Noam Chomsky
 Chubby Carrier
 David Allan Coe
 Commander Cody
 Danny Cox
 Rodney Crowell
 Iris DeMent
 Rick Derringer
 Chris Duarte
 The Elders
 Chris Hillman
 Frank Hicks
 It's a Beautiful Day
 Wanda Jackson
 Jah Roots
 John Jorgenson
 Eric Lindell
 David Lindley
 Little Feat
 Country Joe McDonald
 James McMurtry
 Benjamin Meade
 Roger Miller
 Nace Brothers
 Lee Oskar
 Lee Roy Parnell
 Les Paul
 Herb Pederson
 Ray Price
 The Rainmakers
 Lee Ranaldo
 Kasey Rausch
 Robert Reynolds
 Roomful of Blues
 Douglas Rushkoff
 Billy Joe Shaver
 Kim Simmonds
 Sonic Youth
 Richard Thompson
 Paul Thor
 Bob Walkenhorst
 War
 Watermelon Slim
 Rev. Billy C. Wertz
 Lizzie West
 Edgar Winter
 Johnny Winter
 Carolyn Wonderland

References

External links
 Corticrawl Films
 
 Filmguru on the movie

2008 films
American documentary films
Documentary films about the music industry
2008 documentary films
2000s English-language films
2000s American films